Agis (died 358 BC) was founder and king of the Paeonian kingdom. A contemporary of Philip II of Macedon, Agis was a pretender to the Macedonian throne in a time of instability. His successor was Lycceius.

References

Paeonia (kingdom)
Paeonian kings
4th-century BC rulers